Puzzled is a falling-block puzzle video game developed and published by SNK that was released for Neo Geo arcade hardware in 1990, the Neo Geo home console in 1991, and the Neo Geo CD in 1994. The game was ported to mobile phones in 2005, then was re-published by D4 Enterprise on the Wii Virtual Console in June 2011, and it is also one of the twenty games that came pre-loaded on the Neo Geo X console released in 2012. It was also ported in August 2017 to Nintendo Switch, Xbox One, and PlayStation 4 as part of Hamster Corporation's ACA Neo Geo series.

Gameplay

The visuals of Puzzled look a lot like Tetris and the core gameplay is the same: the player controls tetrominos falling from the top of the screen, and filling a horizontal lines clears it. However, the objective is to clear a vertical path for a hot air balloon initially trapped at the bottom of each level, enabling it to fly off the top of the playing field and moving up to the next level of a tower.

The tower is divided into multiple floors, with 10 levels per floor, totaling 60 different puzzles. Some levels feature varied obstacles like robots floating around the puzzle to attack the balloon, regenerating blocks, and gold blocks that need to be cleared multiple times before disappearing. The player can also use a power-up called an "L-Ball": a meter fills up as lines are cleared, and once ready, the player can trigger a lightning ball to explode outwards from the balloon's current location, removing surrounding blocks.

Development and release

Reception 

In Japan, Game Machine listed Puzzled on their December 15, 1990 issue as being the most-successful table arcade unit of the month, outperforming titles such as Carrier Air Wing and Raiden.

The graphics of Puzzled were described as being simplistic and unremarkable but well-designed and efficient. The sound effects were also considered minimalistic but enjoyable for a game of this type.

The game's multiplayer portion was criticized for not featuring any interactions between the two simultaneous players.

Notes

References

External links 
 
 
 

1990 video games
ACA Neo Geo games
Arcade video games
D4 Enterprise games
Multiplayer and single-player video games
Neo Geo games
Neo Geo CD games
Nintendo Switch games
PlayStation Network games
PlayStation 4 games
Puzzle video games
SNK games
Virtual Console games for Wii
Video games developed in Japan
Xbox One games
Hamster Corporation games